Glyphidocera brocha is a moth in the family Autostichidae. It was described by Adamski and Brown in 2001. It is found in Venezuela.

Etymology
The species name refers to the dentitions on the dorsal margin of the valva and is derived from Latin brochus (meaning projecting teeth).

References

Moths described in 2001
Taxa named by David Adamski
Glyphidocerinae